Major-General Robert Arthur Montgomery,  (7 September 1848 – 1931) was a British Army officer who commanded Southern District.

Military career
Montgomery was commissioned into the Royal Artillery in 1868. He was Deputy Director-General of the Ordnance from 1897, and was appointed Commander Royal Artillery for Southern District, based in Portsmouth, in November 1902, with the rank of major-general. A year later, he became General Officer Commanding Southern District, also based in Portsmouth. He went on to be General Officer Commanding South Coast Defences in April 1904 and then General Officer Commanding Transvaal District in May 1906 before returning to England in April 1908.

He served briefly in the First World War initially as a General Officer Commanding a division of Lord Kitchener's Army at Seaford and then as Director of Recruiting in Autumn 1915.

He came from Greyabbey, Ireland but lived at Pentrepant, in the parish of Selattyn, near Oswestry in Shropshire. He was appointed a Companion of the Order of the Bath (CB) in the June 1902 Coronation Honours list.

References

External links
 

British Army generals of World War I
Companions of the Order of the Bath
Commanders of the Royal Victorian Order
1848 births
1931 deaths
Royal Artillery officers